Sheridan is a neighborhood in the Northeast community in Minneapolis, Minnesota.

Location and characteristics
Sheridan's boundaries are 17th and 18th Avenues NE to the north, Washington Street to the east, Broadway Street NE to the south, and the Mississippi River to the west. It is named for Civil War general Philip Sheridan.

Portions of the Sheridan neighborhood were actually part of the former city of St. Anthony, Minnesota which was annexed by Minneapolis in 1872. Many of the area's initial settlers were immigrants from Eastern and Northern Europe who worked in nearby industries including grain mills, lumber mills, breweries and railroads. The neighborhood's housing was largely built between the 1890s and 1930s and includes a mixture of single and multi-family homes. More recently, many of the neighborhood's industrial spaces have been redeveloped into artist studios and the commercial strip along 13th Avenue NE has been revitalized. It is now considered part of the Northeast Minneapolis Arts District.

Sheridan has a community garden with rentable plots and a mega-plot that's used to grow organic food for the community.

Landmarks
Sheridan is home to Sheridan Global Arts and Communication School (K-8) as well as the New City Charter School (K-8).

13th Avenue NE is the neighborhood's commercial center. In the early 2000s, the street has seen a revival with many formerly empty spaces being converted into restaurants, bars, galleries and small businesses.

The former Minneapolis Brewing Company complex has been redeveloped into offices, studios, apartments and the Pierre Bottineau branch of the Hennepin County Library. Sheridan Memorial Park is located behind the Minneapolis Brewing Company complex on the Mississippi River.

Transportation
Sheridan is served by Metro Transit bus routes 11 (2nd Street NE), 17 (Washington Street) and 30 (Broadway Street). 5th Street NE is a bicycle boulevard and a short separated bike path runs along 18th Ave NE.

References

External links
 Sheridan Memorial Park

Neighborhoods in Minneapolis
Minnesota populated places on the Mississippi River